Hrvatski Košarkaški Klub Posušje (also known simply as Košarkaški Klub Posušje) is a basketball team from the town of Posušje, Bosnia and Herzegovina. It currently competes in the Basketball Championship of Bosnia and Herzegovina, the top tier basketball league of Bosnia and Herzegovina.

History 
The club was founded in 1975 as KK Polivinil. The team stopped its activities because of the war. In 1994 it was reestablished as HKK Posušje, and started competing in the Herzeg-Bosnia League, finishing third in the inaugural season.  It played in the 1999–2000 FIBA Korać Cup. In 2021 the club won back promotion to the top tier league.

Honours 
Herzeg-Bosnia Basketball League
Winners (3): 2012, 2016, 2021
Runner-Up (5): 2010, 2012, 2017, 2018, 2020

Notable players

  Ivan Ramljak

Coaching history

  Ante Nazor
 Tihomir Mustapić
 Robert Jurišić

References

External links 
FIBA Europe Club profile

Posušje
Basketball teams in Bosnia and Herzegovina
Basketball teams established in 1975
Basketball teams in Yugoslavia
Croatian sports clubs outside Croatia